NMS Regina Maria was the second and last of the two s built in Italy for the Romanian Navy in the late 1920s. After the Axis invasion of the Soviet Union on 22 June 1941 (Operation Barbarossa), she took part in the Raid on Constanța a few days later and may have damaged a Soviet destroyer leader during the battle. The powerful Soviet Black Sea Fleet heavily outnumbered Axis naval forces in the Black Sea and the Romanian destroyers were limited to escort duties in the western half of the Black Sea during the war. In early 1944 the Soviets were able to cut off and surround the port of Sevastopol on the Crimean Peninsula. Regina Maria covered convoys evacuating Axis troops from Sevastopol in May and rescued several hundred herself.

Later that year Romania switched sides, but despite that the Soviets seized the Romanian ships and incorporated them into the Soviet Navy. Renamed Letuchiy, the ship served until she was struck from the navy list in 1951 when she was returned to the Romanians who renamed her D22 in 1952. The ship was discarded in 1961 and subsequently scrapped.

Background and design
Following the end of World War I and the re-purchase of two s from Italy, the Romanian Government decided to order also two modern destroyers from the Pattison Yard in Italy, as part of the 1927 Naval Programme. The design was based on the British Shakespeare-class destroyer leaders, but differed in the arrangement of their propulsion machinery. The guns were imported from Sweden and the fire-control system from Germany. Four destroyers were intended to be ordered, but only two were actually built.

Their crew numbered 212 officers and sailors. The ships were powered by two Parsons geared steam turbines, each driving a single propeller, using steam provided by four Thornycroft boilers.

The main armament of the Regele Ferdinand-class ships consisted of five 50-calibre Bofors  guns in single mounts, two superfiring pairs fore and aft of the superstructure and one gun aft of the rear funnel. For anti-aircraft defense, they were equipped with one Bofors  anti-aircraft (AA) gun between the funnels and a pair of  AA guns. The ships were fitted with two triple mounts for  torpedo tubes and could carry 50 mines and 40 depth charges.  They were equipped with a Siemens fire-control system which included a pair of rangefinders, one each for the fore and aft guns.

Modifications
The 40-millimetre guns were replaced by two German  AA guns and a pair of French  M1929 Hotchkiss machineguns were added in 1939. Two Italian depth charge throwers were later installed. During World War II, the 76-millimetre gun was replaced by four  AA guns. In 1943, the two ships were equipped with a German S-Gerät sonar. The following year, the upper forward 120-millimetre gun was replaced by a German  AA gun. German 88-millimetre guns in Romanian service were themselves modified by being fitted with Romanian-produced barrel liners.

Construction and career
Regina Maria, named after Queen Marie of Romania, was ordered on 13 November 1926 and was laid down by Pattison in 1927 at their shipyard in Naples, Italy. She was launched on 2 March 1929 and commissioned on 7 September 1930 after arriving in Romania. The ship was assigned to the Destroyer Squadron, which was visited by King Carol II of Romania and the Prime Minister, Nicolae Iorga, on 27 May 1931. Queen Marie visited her namesake on 22 June 1932 which made a short cruise to Balchik, Bulgaria, that same day. Regina Maria participated in the Coronation Fleet review for King George VI on 19 May 1937 at Spithead.

The Romanians were expecting a Soviet raid and their defences, consisting of Regina Maria, the flotilla leader  and the heavy guns of the German coastal artillery battery Tirpitz, were prepared to engage the Soviet ships. In ten minutes, starting from 03:58, Moskva and Kharkov fired no less than 350 shells from their  guns. The two Soviet ships were silhouetted against the dawn while the Romanian ships were hidden by the coast behind them. The heavy and accurate Axis fire caused Moskva and Kharkov to begin to withdraw while laying down a smoke screen. As they fell back they entered a Romanian minefield and Moskva sank after striking a mine.

Massively outnumbered by the Black Sea Fleet, the Romanian ships were kept behind the minefields defending Constanța for the next several months, training for convoy escort operations. Beginning on 5 October, the Romanians began laying minefields to defend the route between the Bosphorus and Constanța. The minelayers were protected by the destroyers; the submarine  fired two torpedoes at Regina Maria that same day, but missed. After the evacuation of Odessa on 16 October, the Romanians began to clear the Soviet mines defending the port and to lay their own minefields protecting the route between Constanța and Odessa. On 1 December Regina Maria, her sister ship  and Mărăști were escorting a convoy to Odessa when a submarine unsuccessfully attacked the convoy. It was quickly spotted and depth charged by Regina Maria and Regele Ferdinand with the latter claiming a kill. Soviet records do not acknowledge any losses on that date. Regina Maria and Regele Ferdinand escorted another convoy to Odessa on 16–17 December, the last one before ice closed the port.

On 20 April 1942, after the ice had melted, Regina Maria, Mărăști and her sister  escorted the first convoy to Ochakov, although the Romanian destroyers were generally used to escort ships between the Bosphorus and Constanța. On the nights of 22/23 and 24/25 June, Regina Maria, Regele Ferdinand and Mărășești covered the laying of defensive minefields off Odessa. After Sevastopol surrendered on 4 July, a direct route between the port and Constanța was opened in October and operated year-round. On 14 November the German  oil tanker  was torpedoed and damaged by the submarine  at the entrance to the Bosphorus as she was being met by the sisters.

On the night of 9/10 November, Regina Maria and Regele Ferdinand escorted minelayers as they laid a minefield off Sevastopol.

Successful Soviet attacks in early 1944 cut the overland connection of the Crimea with the rest of Ukraine and necessitated its supply by sea. In early April another offensive occupied most of the peninsula and encircled Sevastopol. The Romanians began evacuating the city on 14 April, with their destroyers covering the troop convoys. Four days later, the  cargo ship  was unsuccessfully attacked by the submarines  and L-4. Shortly after the latter submarine missed with her pair of torpedoes, the freighter was bombed and set on fire by Soviet aircraft. Other ships rescued her passengers and crew after they abandoned ship, but Regina Maria and Regele Ferdinand were dispatched to see if she could be salvaged. They put a skeleton crew aboard to operate her pumps and to stabilise her before a pair of tugboats arrived the next morning to tow her to Constanța. Adolf Hitler suspended the evacuation on 27 April, but relented on 8 May after further Soviet attacks further endangered the Axis forces in Sevastopol as they closed within artillery range of the harbour. Regina Maria made two trips to evacuate Axis troops and was part of the last convoy to reach Sevastopol on the night of 11/12 May. Regina Maria and Mărășești covered the minelayers as they sealed off the gap that led to Sevastopol in the minefields defending Sulina on the night of 25/26 May.

After King Michael's Coup on 23 August, Romania declared war on the Axis Powers. Regina Maria remained in harbour until she was seized by the Soviets on 5 September together with the rest of the Romanian Navy. Before being renamed Letuchiy on 20 October, the ship was commissioned into the Soviet Navy on 14 September as part of the Black Sea Fleet, along with her sister. She was struck from the navy list on 3 July 1951 after she had been returned to Romania with her sister on 24 June. The sisters rejoined Mărăști and Mărășești when they were assigned to the Destroyer Squadron upon their return. Regina Maria was renamed D22 when the Romanian destroyers were assigned numbers when the Destroyer Division was redesignated as the 418th Destroyer Division in 1952. The ship continued to serve until April 1961, when she was discarded and subsequently scrapped.

Notes

Citations

Bibliography
 
 

 
 

 

Regele Ferdinand-class destroyers
1929 ships
Ships built in Italy